This is a list of mayors of Kreuzlingen, Thurgau, Switzerland. The executive of Kreuzlingen is the city council (Stadtrat). It is presided by the mayor (Stadtammann von Kreuzlingen, earlier Gemeindeammann).

References 

Kreuzlingen
 
Kreuzlingen